Perwez is a municipality of Wallonia located in the Belgian province of Walloon Brabant. On 1 January 2006 the municipality had 7,487 inhabitants. The total area is 50.81 km², giving a population density of 147 inhabitants per km².

The municipality consists of the following districts: Malèves-Sainte-Marie-Wastines, Orbais, Thorembais-les-Béguines, and Thorembais-Saint-Trond.

References

External links
 
Municipal website (in French)

 
Municipalities of Walloon Brabant